Vembakkam is a town panchayat situated in the Tiruvannamalai district of the Indian state of Tamil Nadu. It contains a BDO office for many villages around it.

Other places with the same name
Other villages in Tamil Nadu that have the same name as Vembakkam:

(12°46'22.0"N 79°57'20.6"E 12.772779, 79.955732)
 Chengalpattu taluk Vembakkam code 629450 (12°48'52.3"N 79°53'35.2"E 12.814523, 79.893106)
 Kanchipuram taluk Vembakkam code 629688
 Cheyyar taluk Vembakkam Code 631232; Vembakkam is a village town panchayat situated in the Tiruvannamalai district of the Indian state of Tamil Nadu. It is located about 20 kilometres from the town of Kanchipuram.
 Tirukalukundram Taluk Vembakkam 629913 (12°39'46.3"N 79°58'16.2"E 12.662851, 79.971166)

Villages in Tiruvannamalai district
Tiruvannamalai district
Cities and towns in Tiruvannamalai district